is a train station located in Matsuura, Nagasaki Prefecture, Japan. It is on the Nishi-Kyūshū Line which has been operated by the third-sector Matsuura Railway since 1988.

Lines
 Matsuura Railway
 Nishi-Kyūshū Line

See also
 List of railway stations in Japan

References
This article incorporates material from the corresponding article in the Japanese Wikipedia.

External links
 
 Matsuura Railway 
 Navitime station timetable 
 Yahoo! Transit Japan 

railway stations in Japan opened in 1989
stations of Matsuura Railway